Sandra Elizabeth Cortez Maravilla (born 2 January 1997) is a Salvadoran footballer who plays as a defender for CD FAS and the El Salvador women's national team.

Club career
Cortez has played for CD FAS in El Salvador.

International career
Cortez represented El Salvador at the 2012 CONCACAF Women's U-17 Championship qualifying. She capped at senior level during the 2018 CONCACAF Women's Championship qualification and the 2020 CONCACAF Women's Olympic Qualifying Championship qualification.

See also
List of El Salvador women's international footballers

References

1997 births
Living people
Salvadoran women's footballers
Women's association football defenders
El Salvador women's international footballers